Anatoli Viktorovich Strokatov (born 1955), is a male former international table tennis player from the USSR.

He won a silver medal at the 1973 World Table Tennis Championships in the mixed doubles with Asta Gedraitite.

He also won three English Open titles.

See also
 List of table tennis players
 List of World Table Tennis Championships medalists

References

Soviet table tennis players
Ukrainian male table tennis players
Sportspeople from Lviv
1955 births
Living people
World Table Tennis Championships medalists